Adam Godley (born 22 July 1964) is a British actor. He has been nominated for two Tony Awards and four Laurence Olivier Awards for his performances on the New York and London stages which include, Private Lives in 2001, The Pillowman in 2002, Anything Goes in 2011, and The Lehman Trilogy in 2019. He made his Broadway debut in 2002 in a revival of Noël Coward's Private Lives for which he earned a Theatre World Award for Outstanding Broadway debut. In 2011 he returned to Broadway in the musical Anything Goes for which he earned a Tony Award for Best Featured Actor in a Musical nomination. In 2021, The Lehman Trilogy made its Broadway transfer to great critical acclaim, and securing Godley another Tony nomination for Best Actor in a Play.

His film roles include Love Actually (2003), Nanny McPhee (2005), Charlie and the Chocolate Factory (2005), Elizabeth The Golden Age (2007) and The Theory Of Everything (2014).  He also has recurring roles as Elliott Schwartz in AMC's Breaking Bad, Nigel Nesbit in USA’s Suits (2013), Phinneus Pogo in Netflix's The Umbrella Academy (2019 to present), and the Archbishop in Hulu's The Great (2020–present).

Early life and education
Godley was born to Jewish parents on 22 July 1964 in Amersham, Buckinghamshire. His father was a solicitor, and his mother was a magistrate. He grew up near Watford, Hertfordshire, and went to Rickmansworth School.

Career 
He began his acting career at the age of 9, in a BBC radio production of Hemingway's My Old Man. His first stage role came at age 11, as Prince Giovanni in The White Devil at The Old Vic. His childhood career also included work at the National Theatre, in Lillian Helman's Watch on the Rhine, and Close of Play, directed by Harold Pinter. Godley achieved national prominence after playing the lead in the 1984 BBC TV adaptation of J. Meade Falkner's Moonfleet.

In 1986, Godley joined Alan Ayckbourn's theatre company in Scarborough, where he stayed for three seasons. Productions included June Moon and The Revengers' Comedies, both of which transferred to the West End, and Mr A's Amazing Maze Plays, which transferred to the National Theatre.

He spent one season as a member of the Royal Shakespeare Company, before creating the role of Cliff in Sam Mendes's production of Cabaret at the Donmar Warehouse in 1993. Several major productions followed, including Mouth to Mouth at the Royal Court, The Front Page at the Donmar, and The Rivals in the West End. after which Godley went on to create a series of roles at the National, including Kenneth Williams in Cleo, Camping, Emmanuelle and Dick; and the title role in Howard Davies' production of Paul. In 1999 he played Jack Worthing in the West End production of The Importance of Being Earnest.

In 2002 he made his film debut in Claude Lelouch's  And Now... Ladies and Gentlemen starring Jeremy Irons and Patricia Kaas which premiered at the Cannes Film Festival. He continued acting in films such as the Christmas classic Love Actually (2003), and  Around the World in 80 Days (2004), Nanny McPhee (2005), and Charlie and the Chocolate Factory (2005). During this time he also had recurring roles as Elliott Schwartz in AMC's Breaking Bad , Nigel Nesbit in Suits and Jocelyn Pugh in Lodge 49.

In 2002 he starred as Victor Prynne alongside Alan Rickman and Lindsay Duncan in a revival of Noël Coward's Private Lives at the Richard Rogers Theatre in New York City, where Godley made his Broadway debut. For his performance he earned a Theatre World Award. The following year Godley starred as Michal in Martin McDonagh's The Pillowman opposite Jim Broadbent and David Tennant at the Royal National Theatre.

In 2010 he played Jonathan Powell in the HBO television film The Special Relationship about Tony Blair's relationship with Bill Clinton. He also appeared in BBC's A Young Doctor's Notebook (2011), CBS's The Good Wife (2012), USA Networks's Suits (2012), Showtime's Homeland (2015), and NBC's The Blacklist (2017).
In 2008 played Raymond Babitt in the West End production of Rain Man opposite Josh Hartnett. In 2011 he played Lord Evelyn Oakleigh in Roundabout Theatre's multi-award-winning Broadway revival of Anything Goes. The production starred Sutton Foster, John McMartin, Jessica Walter and Joel Grey. For his performance he earned a Tony Award nomination, a Drama Desk Award nomination, and an Outer Critics Circle Award. In 2013 he led a new adaptation by Dennis Kelly of Georg Kaiser's 1912 German expressionist masterpiece, From Morning to Midnight, at the National Theatre.

His most recent stage role was as one of the three Lehman brothers in the National Theatre's The Lehman Trilogy.

Personal life
He lives in North Carolina with his partner, writer Jon Hartmere.

Filmography

Film

Television

Theatre

Awards and nominations

References

External links 
 
 http://www.playbill.com interview

1964 births
Living people
20th-century English male actors
21st-century English male actors
Actors from Amersham
Actors from Watford
British expatriate male actors in the United States
English expatriates in the United States
English male child actors
English male film actors
English male stage actors
English male television actors
English male voice actors
Jewish English male actors
English LGBT actors
LGBT Jews
Male actors from Buckinghamshire
Male actors from Hertfordshire
Theatre World Award winners
21st-century LGBT people